The 2019 Derry Senior Football Championship was the 96th edition of Derry GAA's premier gaelic football tournament for the top sixteen clubs. 2019 was the first year of the restructured adult football leagues of Division 1A, Division 1B and Division 2. The sixteen teams who qualified for the 2019 senior championship are explained in the 'Competition Format' section below.

Magherafelt won their first title in 41 years, beating Glen by a solitary point, 0-12 to 0-11, in the final on 20 October 2019 at Celtic Park.

Eoghan Rua, Coleraine were the defending champions having won their second title. They defeated Lavey by 1-12 to 0-12 in the final in Celtic Park on 28 October 2018.

The winners received the John McLaughlin Cup.

Magherafelt and Glen featured heavily on the County Derry Post team of the championship

Competition format

Senior, Intermediate and Junior Championships

Relegations, promotions and rankings within the three divisions of the football league in 2018 were used to determine which of the three 2019 championships the thirty seven clubs competed in – 
 2019 Senior Championship (16 teams)All twelve 2019 Division 1A teams plus four 2019 Division 1B teams based on their rankings in the 2018 leagues
 2019 Intermediate Championship (14 teams)Eight 2019 Division 1B teams plus six 2019 Division 2 teams based on their rankings in the 2018 leagues
 2019 Junior Championship (7 teams)Seven 2019 Division 2 teams based on their rankings in the 2018 leaguesÓgra Colmcille were scheduled to compete in the junior championship but they opted out in 2019.

Senior Championship Teams in 2019

The restructured adult football leagues in Derry of Division 1A (12 teams), Division 1B (12 teams) and Division 2 (13 teams) were introduced in 2019. Five teams were relegated from the 2018 Division 1 to the new 2019 Division 1B (see section 'Relegations and promotions in 2018' below for details). The 2019 senior championship was competed for by the top fifteen teams in the 2018 Division 1 and Banagher, the winners of the 2018 Division 2. Claudy, who finished 16th in 2018, were relegated to the 2019 intermediate football championship.

Current format

The senior championship reverted to straight knock-out in 2016 and the format continues with some minor alterations. If the score is level at the end of the normal sixty minutes, the match is replayed. If the replay is also level at the end of normal time, two ten minute periods of extra time are played each way.

At the end (or close to the end) of each round, a random draw is held to determine the fixtures in the next round.

Previous Formats

A  back-door format was used from 2009 to 2015. Four initial ‘round-robin’ groups of four teams with the top two teams in each group progressing to the four knockout quarter-finals were used in seasons 2007 and 2008.

In the early years of Derry GAA, three separate senior championships were organised – The North Derry Championship, The South Derry Championship and The Derry City Championship. One semi-final and a final were held to determine the overall Derry senior champions. In 1958, a straight knockout format for all senior teams was introduced.

Recent history of relegations and promotions

Relegations and promotions in 2019

Senior Championship

All twelve teams in the 2019 Division 1A automatically qualified for the 2020 senior championship. Four 2019 Division 1B teams also qualified for the 2020 senior football championship –
 Claudy finished 1st in 2019 Division 1B with 19 points.
 Newbridge finished 2nd in 2019 Division 1B with 17 points.
 Kilrea finished 3rd in 2019 Division 1B with 14 points.
 Foreglen won the intermediate championship, defeating Claudy by 0-15 to 0-09. Foreglen took the place in the 2020 senior championship reserved for the 2019 intermediate champions (instead of Greenlough who finished 4th in 2019 Division 1B with 14 points).

League

Two teams were relegated from Division 1A and were replaced by two teams from Division 1B –
 Dungiven finished 11th in 2019 Division 1A with 3 points. They were relegated but retained the right to play in the 2020 senior football championship.
 Banagher finished 12th in 2019 Division 1A with 0 points. They were relegated but retained the right to play in the 2020 senior football championship.
 Claudy finished 1st in 2019 Division 1B with 19 points and were promoted.
 Newbridge finished 2nd in 2019 Division 1B with 17 points and were promoted.

Relegations and promotions in 2018

Senior Championship

Fifteen of the sixteen 2018 Division 1 teams retained the right to play in the 2019 senior championship. Claudy (who finished bottom in 2018) played in the 2019 intermediate championship. Banagher, the winners of the 2018 Division 2, took Claudy's place in the 2019 senior championship.

League

Five teams were relegated from the old Division 1 in 2018 to the new Division 1B in 2019 and one team, Banagher, were promoted –
 Newbridge finished 12th with 12 points and played Banagher, the Division 2 winners, in a relegation/promotion match on 12 October 2018. Banagher won by 2-08 to 1-07 and were promoted to the new Division 1A. Newbridge were relegated to the new Division 1B.
 Kilrea finished 13th with 12 points and were relegated to the new Division 1B.
 Greenlough finished 14th with 8 points and were relegated to the new Division 1B.
 Glenullin finished 15th with 5 points and were relegated to the new Division 1B.
 Claudy finished 16th with 3 points and were relegated to the new Division 1B.

Relegations and promotions in 2017

 After Division 1 football ended on 6 August 2017, Swatragh were 15th in the table with eight points and Banagher were 16th with six points. Swatragh were initially penalised three league points for not fielding against Coleraine which would have meant that Swatragh were relegated. The three point penalty was subsequently overturned and Banagher were relegated.
 Newbridge won Division 2 in 2017 and were promoted to Division 1 and the senior championship for 2018.

Senior Championship Full Draw

The championship began on Friday 6 September 2019. The draw for the first round was held on Thursday 9 May 2019. Subsequent draws are held at the end (or very near the end) of every round. The bracket below can therefore only be completed when the last four teams have been paired in the semi-final draw.

First round
The first round draw was made on Thursday 9 May 2019

Quarter-finals

Semi-finals

Final

Top Scorer

Championship Completed.

References

Derry SFC
Derry Senior Football Championship
Derry Senior Football Championship
Derry Senior Football Championship
Derry Senior Football Championship